Sir Andrew Patrick Charles Tipping  (born 22 August 1942) is a New Zealand jurist who served as a Justice of the Supreme Court of New Zealand from 2004 until his retirement in 2012. He was also a member of the Privy Council of the United Kingdom. His tenure as a jurist has been widely acclaimed and his contributions to the shaping of New Zealand law are considered to be substantial and permanent.

Early life
Born in Oxford, England, Tipping came to New Zealand at an early age. He was educated at Cheltenham College, England, and then at Christ’s College and the University of Canterbury. He graduated with a Bachelor of Arts degree majoring in classics, a Bachelor of Laws degree, and then Master of Laws with first-class honours.

Career
He practiced as a common law partner in the Christchurch firm of Wynn Williams & Co. He was President of the Canterbury District Law Society in 1984 and a council member of the New Zealand Law Society from 1982–1984. In 1986, he was appointed to the High Court. He was promoted to the Court of Appeal on 1 June 1997, and appointed to the Privy Council a year later. In the Court of Appeal he was a member of the court that said the Maori Land Court had jurisdiction to decide the status of the foreshore and seabed in Ngati Apa v Attorney-General.

From 2004 the Privy Council was replaced as New Zealand’s highest appellate court by a Supreme Court of New Zealand, with the passage of the Supreme Court Act 2003. Attorney General Margret Wilson was tasked with appointing the entire bench simultaneously, She announced that the appointments would be based on merit and seniority. This meant on 1 January 2004, Tipping became one of the initial members of the new Supreme Court of New Zealand as the most senior Justices on the Court of Appeal were appointed to the new Court.

Tipping retired from the Supreme Court on 17 August 2012. On 20 September 2012 Tipping was appointed an Acting Judge of the Supreme Court.  He retired as an Acting Judge of the Supreme Court in August 2017 upon reaching the statutory retirement age.

In the 2006 New Year Honours, Tipping was appointed a Distinguished Companion of the New Zealand Order of Merit, for services as a judge of the Supreme Court and Court of Appeal of New Zealand. In the 2009 Special Honours he accepted re-designation as a Knight Companion of the New Zealand Order of Merit following the re-introduction of titular honours by the New Zealand government.

References

1942 births
Living people
Supreme Court of New Zealand judges
Members of the Judicial Committee of the Privy Council
Knights Companion of the New Zealand Order of Merit
New Zealand members of the Privy Council of the United Kingdom
People educated at Cheltenham College
British emigrants to New Zealand
People from Oxford
People educated at Christ's College, Christchurch
University of Canterbury alumni
High Court of New Zealand judges
Court of Appeal of New Zealand judges